The  Green Bay Packers season was their 47th season overall and their 45th season in the National Football League. The  team finished with  a 10–3–1 record under seventh-year head coach Vince Lombardi, earning a tie for first place in the Western Conference with the Baltimore Colts.

In the final regular season game at Kezar Stadium in San Francisco, a late touchdown by the 49ers caused a tie and dropped Green Bay into a tie with the Colts. Although the Packers defeated Baltimore twice during the regular season, the rules at the time required a tiebreaker playoff, played in Green Bay on December 26. With backup quarterbacks playing for both teams, the Packers tied the Colts late and won in overtime, 13–10.

Green Bay then met the defending champion Cleveland Browns (11–3) in the NFL championship game, also at Green Bay. The Packers won, 23–12, for their ninth NFL title and third under Lombardi. It was the last NFL championship game before the advent of the Super Bowl and the first of three consecutive league titles for Green Bay.

Known as "New City Stadium" for its first eight seasons, the Packers' venue in Green Bay was renamed Lambeau Field in August 1965 in memory of Packers founder, player, and long-time head coach, Curly Lambeau, who had died two months earlier.

Roster

Preseason

Regular season

Schedule

Game summaries

Week 2

Playoffs

Standings

References

Sportsencyclopedia.com

Green Bay Packers seasons
National Football League championship seasons
Green Bay Packers
Green